Brent Forrest Stockstill (born August 5, 1994) is an American football coach and former player who is currently the quarterbacks coach and passing game coordinator at Middle Tennessee State. A former quarterback at Middle Tennessee, he set multiple career program records including passing yards, touchdown passes, completed passes, and pass attempts. Stockstill had also obtained a reputation for being one of the toughest players in college football for his ability to play while being hindered by injuries.

Early life and high school 
Stockstill was born in South Carolina to Rick and Sara Stockstill. Rick was an assistant coach at Clemson at the time. When Rick was an assistant coach, he would pull Brent out of school on Fridays to accompany him on recruiting trips and visits. He has a younger sister, Emily who attended the University of Alabama and worked for the university's football program. The Stockstills moved to Murfreesboro, Tennessee in 2005 when Rick was named the head coach at Middle Tennessee State.

Stockstill played quarterback at Siegel High School in Tennessee where as a high school senior, he threw for 2,690 yards and 32 touchdowns. One of his notable games was where he threw for 373 yards and four touchdowns in a loss, despite tearing his ACL and partially tearing his meniscus the week prior. A two to three-star recruit, Stockstill committed to play college football at Cincinnati over offers from Texas Tech, Memphis, Western Michigan, and Toledo.

College career 
Initially committed to Cincinnati, Stockstill was granted a release from his national letter of intent to play for his father Rick at Middle Tennessee State. He also was a member of the school's baseball program, where he compiled a 1.69 ERA as a pitcher in 2014 and later redshirting to focus on football.

2013 

Stockstill grayshirted the 2013 season and did not see any action.

2014 

Stockstill played in the team's opening game against Savannah State, throwing for 41 yards. He did not play the rest of the season, and was granted a redshirt for the knee injury he suffered in high school.

2015 

As a redshirt freshman, Stockstill competed in the offseason for the starting quarterback job against incumbent starter Austin Grammer. He was named the starting quarterback for the team's first game of the season against Jackson State. As a redshirt freshman, he set single-season program records for passing yards, passing touchdowns, passing completions and passing attempts en route to being named Conference USA's Freshman of the Year.

2016 

Coming off a stellar freshman campaign, Stockstill was once again the starting quarterback entering the 2016 season. After throwing for 2,801 yards and 27 touchdowns in the first eight games, he suffered a broken collarbone against UTSA and was initially said to be out for the remainder of the season. He was cleared to return for the bowl game in the Hawaii Bowl against Hawaii, where he threw for 451 yards and four touchdowns in a loss.

2017 

Stockstill once again suffered an injury in a game against Syracuse where he suffered a cracked sternum and injuries to his shoulder. He proceeded to miss the next six games before returning for the Blue Raiders game against UTEP. He finished the season with 1,672 passing yards, 16 touchdowns, and 8 interceptions.

2018 

Stockstill played in all 14 of the Blue Raiders game in 2018, only leaving the game against FIU to a lower body injury. Stockstill had another career year with the Blue Raiders, throwing for 3,544 yards, 29 touchdowns, and 10 interceptions en route to being named to the Conference USA's Most Valuable Player.

Coaching career 
Stockstill began his coaching career at Florida Atlantic under Lane Kiffin as an offensive player personnel assistant in 2019. He joined the coaching staff at South Florida under first-year head coach Jeff Scott as an offensive quality control analyst in 2020 after Kiffin left Florida Atlantic for Ole Miss.

Stockstill was named the wide receivers coach at his alma mater Middle Tennessee State on January 9, 2021. He was reassigned to quarterbacks coach and added the title of passing game coordinator in 2022.

References

External links 
 Brent Stockstill on Twitter
 Middle Tennessee Blue Raiders bio

1994 births
Living people
People from Clemson, South Carolina
People from Murfreesboro, Tennessee
Players of American football from Tennessee
Baseball players from Tennessee
American football quarterbacks
Baseball pitchers
Baseball outfielders
Middle Tennessee Blue Raiders football players
Middle Tennessee Blue Raiders baseball players
Florida Atlantic Owls football coaches
South Florida Bulls football coaches
Middle Tennessee Blue Raiders football coaches